Cinca can refer to:

 Cinca (Spain), a river in Aragon, Spain
 Cinca (Romania), a river in Timiș County, Romania